Pronuba decora is a species of beetle in the family Cerambycidae. It was described by Thomson in 1860.

References

Eburiini
Beetles described in 1860